Selex RAN-40L is a naval 3D L band search radar developed by Leonardo. The radar is used for long range maritime air surveillance and early warning. The radar uses a fully solid state active phased array antenna and capable of tracking and detecting air targets like aircraft or drones up to 400 km away. RAN-40L is based on existing land based 3D RAT-31DL radar which is a system widely used by NATO Countries for long air surveillance.

The radar functions include Track While Scan for air and surface long-range surveillance and missile tracking . Radar coverage is obtained by phase scanning in elevation, while mechanically rotating in azimuth. The antenna rotates at 6rpm or 12rpm, with 360° azimuth coverage.

Operators 

 INS Vikrant Aircraft Carrier

 Italian aircraft carrier Cavour
 Durand de la Penne-class destroyers

See also 
Selex RAT-31DL
SMART-L
AN/SPY-3
AN/SPY-6
OPS-24
OPS-50
Type 346 Radar
Phased array
Active electronically scanned array
Active phased array radar

References 

Military radars of Italy
Naval radars
Military equipment of Italy